Igor Vyacheslavovich Zakharov (born 5 November 1975) is a former Russian football player.

Club career
He made his Russian Premier League debut for FC Fakel Voronezh on 1 April 2000 in a game against FC Alania Vladikavkaz.

References

1975 births
Sportspeople from Oryol
Living people
Russian footballers
FC Oryol players
FC Fakel Voronezh players
Russian Premier League players
FC Tom Tomsk players
FC Salyut Belgorod players

Association football midfielders